The 2008 Asian Men's Club Volleyball Championship was the 9th staging of the AVC Club Championships. The tournament was held in Almaty, Kazakhstan.

Pools composition
The teams are seeded based on their final ranking at the 2007 Asian Men's Club Volleyball Championship.

''* Withdrew, replaced by Kazakhstan B.

Preliminary round

Pool A

|}

|}

Pool B

|}

|}

Classification 5th–8th

Semifinals

|}

7th place

|}

5th place

|}

Final round

Semifinals

|}

3rd place

|}

Final

|}

Final standing

Awards
MVP:  Marat Imangaliyev (Almaty)
Best Scorer:  Hicham Guemmadi (Al-Nasr)
Best Server:  Ali Kerboua (Al-Nasr)
Best Spiker:  Mohsen Andalib (Paykan)
Best Blocker:  Alireza Nadi (Paykan)
Best Receiver:  Dmitriy Gorbatkov (Almaty)
Best Setter:  Alexey Stepanov (Almaty)
Best Digger:  Kenji Sabato (Suntory)

References
Asian Volleyball Confederation
  Results

V
A
V